COMDI is application software for online broadcasting. It was developed in Russia. An online service of the same name provides SaaS visitors with the opportunity to conduct online-meetings for an audience of up to 1500 people. The service is implemented on Flash technology and is available on any Flash-capable browser (version 10 and higher) and has integration tools (API). Broadcast servers sit in Russia.

COMDI is offered as a replicable software (under license) as well as an embedded component for websites, to provide additional services to visitors.

History
The software launched on September 1, 2009.

In 2012, COMDI merged with Webinar.ru, an IT company specializing in the development and delivery of web and video conferencing services. After the merger, COMDI products began to be sold in Russia under Webinar.ru brand, in other countries, as well as in mobile applications, the trademark COMDI was still used..

Functions

While the functionality includes elements of distance learning systems and video conferencing products, the focus is on tools for business communication necessary for conducting webinars:

 direct voice / video broadcasting (1 moderator and up to 1500+ listeners)
 voice / video conference (2-8 participants)
 instant messaging (chat)
 presentation of files of loffice formats with the whiteboard function (shared by the participants of the online meeting)
 file sharing 
 screen sharing

Awards 
The service won the Runet Award 2010 in the Technology and Innovations category.

References

External links
 ВТБ Капитал инвестирует в веб-сервис COMDI. // IBusiness.Ru.- 06.2011
 «ВымпелКом» ввел сервис видеоконференцсвязи для пользователей «Домашнего Интернета» в Москве и Санкт-Петербурге. // ПРАЙМ-ТАСС.- 06.2010
 Александр Милицкий. «Билайн» и видео. // Slon.ru.- 06.2010
 Будущее маркетинга за вебинарами? // Brainity.ru.- 06.2010
 Технология проведения вебинара // Нижегородский коммерсант.- 09.2010
 TEZ TOUR ввел новую услугу для партнеров — вебинары // Туризм и отдых.- 07.2011

Legal software